Harrison's large-eared giant mastiff bat (Otomops harrisoni) is a species of bat found in Northeast Africa and the Arabian Peninsula.
It was described as a new species in 2015.
The IUCN evaluates it as a vulnerable species.

Taxonomy and etymology
It was described as a result of a taxonomic split in the large-eared free-tailed bat, Otomops martiensseni.
It was split from O martiensseni based on morphological and genetic data.
It has a genetic distance from O. martiensseni of 2.10%.
The authors chose the species name "harrisoni" after the late mammalogist David L. Harrison. Of Harrison, they wrote: "[his] numerous publications on Afro-Arabian Chiroptera, in particular the Molossidae, have significantly improved our knowledge of this poorly known family."

Description
It is the largest member of its genus, and possesses the most robust skull.
Its ears project over its face, meeting in the middle over its nose.
It has a minute tragus.
Around its lips are loose folds of skin.
Males have a gular gland located at the base of their throats.
Its hind feet are broad, with long white hairs.
It can be differentiated from other members of its genus based on its long cranium and exceptionally high braincase.
Its fur is short and velvety.
On its back, the fur is dark chocolate brown; it has a "distinct cream-coloured collar" around its neck.
Fur on its ventral side is lighter than its back.
The edges of its body and of its wing membranes have a thin, but distinct, band of white fur.

Biology
It is insectivorous, feeding primarily on moths.
Moth species in the Saturniidae, Noctuidae, and Geometridae families seem to be preferred.
Females are monoestrous, with one breeding season per year.
Pregnant females have been documented from October to January, though parturition occurs in December for the majority of females.
Its litter size is one pup, born hairless and altricial.
It is a colonial species, forming colonies consisting of hundreds or thousands of individuals; a colony of 15,000 once roosted in a cave in Mount Suswa, though they are now almost entirely gone from the cave.

Range and habitat
Its range includes Yemen, Djibouti, Ethiopia, and Kenya.
It is most likely to occur in the eastern portion of Sub-Saharan Africa, also including Eritrea.
They have been documented in woodlands, shrublands, montane grasslands, xeric grasslands, and thickets.
During the day, they roost in mountain caves or lava caves.

Conservation
It is currently evaluated as vulnerable by the IUCN.
It meets the criteria for this designation because there have been extreme population declines located at two of its roosts from 1997–2017 (Mount Suswa cave and Ithundu cave).
Disturbance of the caves that it uses as roosts is a major threat to the continued existence of this species.
Caves are disturbed via mining for guano, tourism, caving, and blocking cave entrances.

References

External links
A photograph of a skull of this species
Images of live bats 
More images of this species
A short video of this species in the Mt. Suswa lava caves

Bats of Africa
Bats of Asia
Mammals described in 2015
Otomops